Sadi (also Romanized as Sa‘dī; also known as Sa‘dīābād) is a village in Baghin Rural District, in the Central District of Kerman County, Kerman Province, Iran. At the 2006 census, its population was 1,382, in 377 families.

References 

Populated places in Kerman County